Thomas Hay Sweet Escott (26 April 1844, in Taunton – 13 June 1924, in Hove) was an English journalist and editor.

Life
The son of Hay Escott of Launton, he received from Queen's College, Oxford his B.A. degree in 1865 and his M.A. in 1868. At King's College London he was a lecturer in logic from 1865 to 1872 and deputy professor of classical literature from 1866 to 1873.

In 1866 Escott became a leader writer for The Standard. In October 1882 he replaced John Morley as the editor of The Fortnightly Review; in 1886, however, he suffered a physical and emotional breakdown in health and officially resigned in August of that year.

During the last 35 years of his life Escott lived in semi-retirement in Brighton, in poor health. He seems to have written nothing from 1886 to June 1894, and there is no record of his employment during those years. By 1895 he had partially recovered, and he wrote over 100 articles and a number of books before his death in 1924.

His acquaintances included a wide variety of prominent people in literature and the arts, including W. S. Gilbert and Alfred Tennyson. Among Escott's close friends were Wilkie Collins, Charles Reade, and the historian Alexander Kinglake.

Family
Escott married Katherine Jane Liardet in 1865; the marriage produced three children and ended with her death in 1899. His second wife was the widow Edith Hilton.

Selected publications
;

References

External links
 
 

English male journalists
Alumni of The Queen's College, Oxford
Academics of King's College London
1844 births
1924 deaths